David Thomas (March 22, 1905 – July 27, 1968), nicknamed "Showboat", was an American first baseman in the Negro leagues from 1929 to 1946.

A native of Mobile, Alabama, Thomas is considered one of the greatest defensive first basemen in Negro leagues history. In 1945 at age 40, he and Terris McDuffie were given a tryout by Branch Rickey and the Brooklyn Dodgers, two years prior to Jackie Robinson's breaking of the baseball color line.

Thomas died in Mobile in 1968 at age 63.

References

External links
 and Baseball-Reference Black Baseball stats and Seamheads

1905 births
1968 deaths
Baltimore Black Sox players
Birmingham Black Barons players
Brooklyn Royal Giants players
New York Black Yankees players
New York Cubans players
Washington Black Senators players
Baseball first basemen
Baseball players from Alabama
Sportspeople from Mobile, Alabama
20th-century African-American sportspeople